The Evesham Cricket Club Ground in Evesham, Worcestershire was used for first-class cricket by Worcestershire County Cricket Club on a single occasion: a County Championship match against Gloucestershire in 1951, which Worcestershire won by six wickets. Edwin Cooper made 122 for the home side, while Reg Perks took 7-65 in the first innings.

The ground was also used for two of the county's Second XI games, in 1968 and 1978.

References
 Evesham Cricket Club Ground from CricketArchive. Retrieved 9 December 2006.

Cricket grounds in Worcestershire
Evesham